Tianguá is a municipality in the state of Ceará in the Northeast region of Brazil.

The municipality contains part of the  Serra da Ibiapaba Environmental Protection Area, created in 1996. Currently is governed by Mayor Luiz Menezes de Lima.

Toponymy
The toponym "Tianguá", according to the book "Tianguá ... Roots of its history and culture", page 99, is a Portuguese term from the Tupi words "Tyanha" (hook) and "Guaba" (water), which that is to say: the hook that holds the waters, alluding to the Tianguá River (a stream that runs south of the city) and its tributaries.

History
The town of Tianguá was elevated to the category of city in 1938, through Decree-Law No. 448 of September 20 of that year.

Geography
The municipality of Tianguá is divided into three distinct areas: cuesta, carrasco and sertão.

See also
List of municipalities in Ceará

References

External link

Municipalities in Ceará